Lake Harriet may refer to:

Lake Harriet (Minnesota)
Lake Harriet (Oregon)